Bansur is a town and tehsil in Alwar district in Rajasthan, India. In the State Budget, of the fiscal year 2020-21, it has been upgraded to Municipality or Nagar-Palika (नगरपालिका) status. Bansur town is the headquarters of the tehsil by the same name. It belongs to Jaipur Division. It is located 46 km west of the district headquarters Alwar and 117 km south of the state capital Jaipur.

References

Villages in Alwar district